Golden Ticket is the third studio album of DJ/producer and musician Danny Byrd. It was released on 24 June 2013 through Hospital Records.

In the album, Danny Byrd explores UK garage while keeping his familiar drum & bass style. The album was intended to be "a bit more edgy/urban" compared to the all-liquid sound of Supersized and the rave sound of Rave Digger. The album has managed to chart at No. 181 in the UK.

Track listing

Sample credits
 "4th Dimension" samples "Intergalactic" by Beastie Boys
 "Love You Like This" samples "In Love With You" by The Paradise (Alan Braxe and Romauld)

Garage remixes
The garage remixes of Golden Ticket were released later near the end of the year on 2 December 2013.

The drum and bass tracks "Get on It" and "Make It Weighty" were remixed by MC Majestic and Wookie, respectively, and the garage tracks "New Day" and "Touchline" were given dub mixes from Danny Byrd himself.

Chart performance

Release history

References

External links
 

2013 albums
Danny Byrd albums
Hospital Records albums